The 1995 PBA Commissioner's Cup Finals was the best-of-7 championship series of the 1995 PBA Commissioner's Cup, and the conclusion of the conference playoffs. The Sunkist Orange Juicers and the Alaska Milkmen played for the 61st championship contested by the league.

The Alaska Milkmen and Sunkist Orange Juicers clash in the PBA finals for the third straight conference, living up to their billing as the rivalry of the mid-1990s. Sunkist repeated over Alaska for their second straight crown of the season and fourth title overall as the Orange Juicers bolster its bid towards the Grandslam.

Qualification

Series scoring summary

Games summary

Game 1

Alaska led 96-88 going into the final 3:13 of regulation but a 6-0 roll by Sunkist capped by a three-pointer from Boybits Victoria cut the lead to two, 96-94 with two minutes left. Vergel Meneses scored two short jumpers, the last over Merwin Castelo with 46.2 seconds remaining, to tie the count and forces overtime at 98-all. Meneses team up with Nelson Asaytono and Ronnie Grandison in the extra period as the Juicers unleashed a 9-4 spurt that gave them a 107-102 advantage with time down to 2:02.

Game 2

The Milkmen led by as many as 19 points in the first half but foul trouble on big men Cris Bolado, Bong Hawkins and import Derrick Hamilton allowed the Juicers to come within a point, 92-91, a final 11-2 burst capped by a two-handed back dunk by Hamilton gave Alaska a 103-93 lead with only 33.6 seconds left. Hamilton finished the game with 44 points and 12 rebounds.

Game 3

With Alaska guard Johnny Abarrientos sideline with a bruised right thigh, Sunkist turned to Nelson Asaytono for the crucial baskets in the last 1:26 to thwart the milkmen's final rally. The Juicers led by 17 points, 54-37, at the start of the third quarter, but the milkmen rallied to within four points, 85-89 with 1:43 left, despite Abarrientos' absence.

Game 4

Game 5

Game 6

Sunkist came in full battle gear and right from the first half took a commanding 16-point lead at 52-36. The Milkmen gave the Juicers a scare in the third quarter but after several miscues, the Orange Juicers regained composure to upend an impending rally.

Rosters

Broadcast notes

References

External links
PBA official website

1995 PBA season
1995
Alaska Aces (PBA) games
Pop Cola Panthers games
PBA Commissioner's Cup Finals
PBA Commissioner's Cup Finals